Professor Ferdinand Fairfax Stone (December 12, 1908 – June 10, 1989) was an American long-time law professor at the Tulane University School of Law in New Orleans and an expert in comparative law.  A native of Urbana, Ohio, he graduated from Ohio State University, where he obtained both a bachelor's and master's degree before attending Oxford University in England as a Rhodes Scholar.  He obtained two bachelor's and one master's degrees from Oxford, as well as a doctorate from Yale University.

Stone was the author of many books and articles in comparative law in French and English.  One of his textbooks on American law was the first published in French.

Stone was an expert on, and a prolific writer of, the law of Torts.

In addition to his teaching duties, while an active member of Tulane's faculty from 1937 to 1978, as a visiting professor in other institutions and as the W. R. Irby Professor Emeritus after retiring, in 1949 he founded and headed until 1979 Tulane's Institute of Comparative Law, served on the Board of Editors of the American Journal of Comparative Law, a member of the International Academy of Comparative Law and a director of the Society for Comparative Study of Law.

Honors and recognitions
 Rhodes Scholar, Oxford University
 Sterling Fellow, Yale University
 W. R. Irby Professor Emeritus, Tulane University
 Order of the British Empire
 Honorary Degree, Université de Grenoble 
 Ferdinand Fairfax Stone Scholarship, Tulane University School of Law
 Ferdinand F. Stone Graduate Fellowship, Tulane University

Publications
 Common Problems and Uncommon Solutions in the Law of Torts, 2 Ga. L. Rev. 145

References

1908 births
1989 deaths
American jurists
Tulane University Law School faculty
American Rhodes Scholars
Alumni of Exeter College, Oxford
Ohio State University alumni